Mowse may refer to:
 William Mowse (died 1588), an English lawyer and Master of Trinity Hall, Cambridge
 a DC comic character

MOWSE may refer to :
 MOWSE, a method for identification of proteins from the molecular weight of peptides created by proteolytic digestion